Artvin Atatürk Statue, is a monument in Artvin, Turkey. Monument consists of the world's largest Atatürk statue made of steel and copper. The monument was completed in 2012 and unveiled in a ceremony in 2017. It is the most popular site in Artvin with more than 35.000 visitors per year. Monument was sculpted by Georgian sculptor Jumber Jikia.

References 

Monuments and memorials to Mustafa Kemal Atatürk in Turkey
Buildings and structures completed in 2012
Artvin
21st-century architecture in Turkey